Saint Balthazar; also called  Balthasar, Balthassar, and Bithisarea, was according to Western Christian tradition one of the biblical Magi along with Caspar and Melchior who visited the infant Jesus after he was born. Balthazar is traditionally referred to as the King of Arabia and gave the gift of myrrh to Jesus.  In the Catholic Church, he is regarded as a saint (as are the other two Magi).

Tradition 
The Gospel of Matthew does not give the names of the Magi (or even how many there were), but their traditional names are ascribed to a Greek manuscript from 500 AD translated into Latin and commonly accepted as the source of the names. In this original manuscript, Balthazar is called Bithisarea, which later developed into Balthazar in Western Christianity. Balthazar was described in the 8th century by Saint Bede as being "[of] black complexion, with [a] heavy beard" with the "myrrh he held in his hands prefigured the death of the Son of man".

As part of the Magi, Balthazar followed the Star of Bethlehem first to the palace of Herod the Great who instructed them to return to him when they had found the Child Jesus. When they arrive at the house, the Magi worshipped him and presented their gifts. Balthazar gave the gift of myrrh, which symbolised the future death of a king, as myrrh was an expensive item at the time. Following his return to his own country, avoiding King Herod, it is purported that Balthazar celebrated Christmas with the other members of the Magi in Armenia in 54 AD but later died on 6 January 55 AD, aged 112. The feast day of Balthazar is also 6 January, as the date of his death.

Balthasar and Gaspar, another of the Magi, are characters in the 1880 novel Ben-Hur: A Tale of the Christ and the various film adaptions of the novel, which chronicles his later years.

Commemoration 
Balthazar, along with the other Magi, are purported to be buried in the Shrine of the Three Kings in Cologne Cathedral following his remains being moved from Constantinople by Eustorgius I in 344 AD to Milan. In 1164, Holy Roman Emperor Fredrick Barbarossa moved them to Cologne. Balthazar is commemorated on Epiphany with the other members of the Magi but in Catholicism, Balthazar's feast day is on 6 January because it was the day that he died.

Blackface controversy and traditional iconic representation

Many traditionally Christian countries stage pageants that include roles for the three wise men. In mainland European countries it is customary for Balthazar, based on Saint Bede's description of him, to be portrayed by a person in blackface. In a tradition dating from the Middle Ages dark skinned people were described as bringers of gold. In the 21st century, a number of campaigns in Spain pushed for a black person to play Balthazar rather than a person in blackface, which potentially goes against the tradition that local city councillors play the role.

Since King Balthazar, in traditional pictorial representations from the Late Middle Ages, is represented as a black person (as an integrating or cosmopolitan graphic symbol, in the tradition that the "wise men" or "magi" who worshipped Jesus in Bethlehem represented the peoples of the whole world), fitting in with this traditional icon motivated his representation in the cavalcades of Three Wise Men by a person made up in black. In many Spanish towns that custom continues, while others now ask a prominent resident of African descent to take on this role in the cavalcades.

See also

References 

Biblical Magi
Christmas characters
Unnamed people of the Bible
Saints from the Holy Land
1st-century BC Christian saints
Christian saints from the New Testament
Black people in European folklore
Black people in art
Myrrh